Trouble In Paradise is a 1986 J-pop album by Anri and released by For Life Records. This was Anri's tenth studio album.

Track listings
All songs arranged by Akira Inoue.

Personnel
Anri - vocals
Akira Inoue: keys
Nobuo Tsunetomi -  acoustic guitar
Ian Bairnson -  guitar
David Rhodes -  guitar
Pandit Dinesh -  Indian percussion
Tony Beard -  drums
Bill Bruford -  drums
Simon Phillips -  drums
Laurence Cottle -  bass (credited as Lawrence Cottle)
Graham Edwards -  bass
Felix Krish -  bass
Mark Feltham -  harmonica
Delroy Murray -  male backing vocals
Robin Achampong -  male backing vocals
Carol Kenyon -  female backing vocals
Johnathan Sorrel -  Synclavier programming
Rimi Shionaya -  programming

1986 albums